Bogles is a town on the island of Carriacou in Grenada.

References

Populated places in Grenada
Populated places in Carriacou and Petite Martinique